The Berks & Bucks Football Association is the County Football Association for Berkshire and Buckinghamshire. It is responsible for the development of association football in the two historic counties. It organises cup competitions between affiliated football clubs and the selects two representative teams. It was formed in 1878, with the first president and driving force being Mr J H Clark from Maidenhead.  

The Berks & Bucks FA's administrative headquarters are in Abingdon, Berkshire's traditional county town. It is affiliated to England's national football association: the Football Association.

Cup competitions
The Berks & Bucks FA organises a number of County Cup competitions for its members. The flagship event is its Senior Invitation Cup, which was first held in 1878. This is a full list of the 18 County Cups it organises:

Men's
 Senior Cup
 The Charles Twelftree Trophy
 Sunday Cup
 Sunday Trophy

Women's
 Women's Senior Cup
 Women's Trophy

Youth
 The Bill Gosling U18 Youth Cup
 U16 Youth Cup
 U15 Youth Cup
 U14 Youth Cup
 U13 Youth Cup
U12 Youth Cup

Girls'
 U18 Girls' Cup
 U16 Girls' Cup
 U15 Girls' Cup
 U14 Girls' Cup
 U13 Girls' Cup
U12 Girls' Cup

Representative teams
The Berks & Bucks FA runs two representative teams:
 Youth under-18 team
 Minor under-16 team

Affiliate leagues
Six leagues in the English football league pyramid are affiliated to the Berks & Bucks FA, all of whose top levels sit just below the bottom of the Football Association's National League System, which covers the fifth to eleventh tiers of football in England. The leagues are self-governing and some members are registered with another county football association. The four leagues are: 
 East Berkshire Football League (5 divisions)
 North Berks League (5 divisions)
 North Bucks & District Football League (4 divisions)
 Thames Valley Premier Football League (6 divisions)

Other affiliated men's 11-a-side leagues are the Aylesbury & District League, the Bracknell Town & District Sunday League, the Chesham Sunday League, the Chiltern Church League, the Grant & Stone High Wycombe Sunday Combination, the Milton Keynes Sunday League, the Newbury & District Sunday League, the Reading & District Sunday League, the Upper Thames Valley League.

In the women's game in England, the Thames Valley Women's Football League's three divisions, which belong in the sixth and seventh tiers of the league pyramid, are the only competitions in the pyramid which are affiliated to the Berks & Bucks FA. 

A number of small-sided, women's football and youth football leagues are also affiliates.

Affiliate clubs
The clubs in The Football League that are located in the Berks & Bucks area are:
 Milton Keynes Dons
 Reading
 Wycombe Wanderers

References

External links
 Official website of the Berks and Bucks FA
 East Berkshire Football League
 North Berks Football League
 North Bucks & District Football League
 Reading Football League

County football associations
Football in Berkshire
Football in Buckinghamshire
Sports organizations established in 1878